Robert "Bob" Gardner is an Ohio politician and former Republican member of the Ohio Senate. He represented the 18th District, which encompasses all of Lake County as well as portions of Cuyahoga and Geauga Counties, from 1997 to 2004. He was succeeded by Tim Grendell. Along with his stint in the Ohio Senate, he also made an unsuccessful bid for the United States House of Representatives in 1992, losing to Eric Fingerhut.

Notes

Living people
Republican Party Ohio state senators
21st-century American politicians
Year of birth missing (living people)